The Kitchener Greenshirts name has been used by five separate ice hockey teams playing in Kitchener, Ontario, Canada. These include one 'Senior A' level hockey team, two 'Junior A' level teams, and two 'Junior B' level teams. The name has also been used for a team in the Ontario Minor Hockey Association (OMHA).

Senior A (c.1917 to c.1938)

The Kitchener Hockey Club, commonly known as the Kitchener Greenshirts were a senior ice hockey team. Kitchener won the J. Ross Robertson Cup in 1918 and 1928, as the senior champion of the Ontario Hockey Association (OHA). Kitchener also won the 1918 Allan Cup as the national champions of Canada. 

Hockey Hall of Fame goaltender George Hainsworth played senior hockey for the Greenshirts from 1917 to 1923. Another Hall of Famer, Earl Seibert played one game with the team in 1928.

List of National Hockey League (NHL) alumni:

Junior A (c.1922 to c.1938)
The first junior ice hockey Greenshirts team played in the OHA the early 1920s to the start of World War II. This Junior A program operated in affiliation to the Senior A team of the same name.
 
The team was known as the Kitchener Colts when they won the J. Ross Robertson Cup as the OHA junior champions in 1923. The Colts eventually advanced to play the University of Manitoba in a two-game, total-goals series in Toronto to decide the 1923 Memorial Cup winner. The university won consecutive 7–3 contests to capture the Cup by a total score of 14–6.

The team later became the Greenshirts and were finalists for the J. Ross Robertson Cup in 1929. The Greenshirts were awarded the J. Ross Robertson Cup by default in the 1934–35 season after winning a protest on the series it had lost to the Oshawa Generals. The decision on the protest came too late for Kitchener to challenge the Northern Champion Sudbury Cub Wolves for the right to compete for the Memorial Cup. The Greenshirts were runners-up in the J. Ross Robertson Cup finals in 1936.

Five future Hockey Hall of Famers played junior hockey for the Greenshirts during this era: Bobby Bauer, Woody Dumart, Milt Schmidt, Earl Seibert & Babe Siebert.   

List of National Hockey League (NHL) alumni:

Junior B (c.1939 to c.1949)
With many high calibre Junior A and NHL players involved in military service, Kitchener was left with a Junior B team to fill the void. 

Future NHLers Howie Meeker & Dutch Reibel played for the Junior B Greenshirts during the 1940s. Howie Meeker would be inducted into the Hockey Hall of Fame as a broadcaster.

Junior A (1951 to 1954)

The second Junior A team in the Ontario Hockey Association known as the Kitchener Greenshirts played from 1951 to 1954 at the Kitchener Memorial Auditorium. 

The Greenshirts were granted as an expansion team for the 1951–52 season. The first Junior A season in Kitchener since World War II was successful in gaining local fan support, and beating out rivals Waterloo Hurricanes to be the best team in the twin cities.

Bill Harrington won the Red Tilson Trophy as the OHA's Most Outstanding Player while goaltending for the 1951–52 season with the Greenshirts.

The team played three years in total from 1951 to 1954, then were renamed the Kitchener Canucks. The Kitchener Canucks later became the Peterborough TPT Petes.

NHL alumni
List of National Hockey League (NHL) alumni:

Yearly results
List of season-by-season results:

Junior B (c.1963 to c.1978)

Ontario Minor Hockey
There has also been a minor ice hockey team in the Ontario Minor Hockey Association with the name Kitchener Greenshirts. Its NHL alumni include, Kevin Miehm, Steve Seftel, Brad Schlegel, Paul Reinhart, Brad Shaw and Nick Stajduhar.

References

Defunct Ontario Hockey League teams
Sport in Kitchener, Ontario